The Harvest Moon is a 1920 American silent drama film directed by J. Searle Dawley and starring Doris Kenyon, Wilfred Lytell, and George Lessey. It was shot at the Fort Lee studios in New Jersey.

Cast
 Doris Kenyon as Dora Fullerton 
 Wilfred Lytell as Willard Holcomb 
 George Lessey as Jacques Vavin
 Earl Schenck as Professor Fullerton 
 Peter Lang as Judge Elliott 
 Marie Shotwell as Mrs. Winthrop 
 Stuart Robson as Graham Winthrop 
 Grace Barton as Cornelia Fullerton 
 Daniel Pennell as Henri 
 Edna Holland as Madame Mercier 
 Ellen Olson as Marie

References

Bibliography
 Koszarski, Richard . Fort Lee: The Film Town (1904-2004). Indiana University Press, 2005.

External links

1920 films
1920 drama films
Silent American drama films
Films directed by J. Searle Dawley
American silent feature films
1920s English-language films
Pathé Exchange films
American black-and-white films
Films shot in Fort Lee, New Jersey
Films distributed by W. W. Hodkinson Corporation
1920s American films